Impossible, Imposible or Impossibles may refer to:

Music
 ImPossible (album), a 2016 album by Divinity Roxx
 The Impossible (album), a 1981 album by Ken Lockie

Groups
 The Impossibles (American band), a 1990s indie-ska group from Austin, Texas
 The Impossibles (Australian band), an Australian band
 The Impossibles (Thai band), a 1970s Thai rock band

Songs
 "Impossible" (Captain Hollywood Project song) (1993)
 "The Impossible" (song), a country music song by Joe Nichols (2002)
 "Impossible" (Edyta song) (2003)
 "Impossible" (Kanye West song) (2006)
 "Impossible" (Daniel Merriweather song) (2009)
 "Impossible" (Måns Zelmerlöw song) (2009)
 "Impossible" (Anberlin song) (2010)
 "Impossible" (Shontelle song) (2010), covered by James Arthur (2012)
 "Impossible", from Rodgers and Hammerstein's 1957 musical Cinderella
 "Impossible", a song written by Steve Allen and recorded by Nat King Cole for his 1958 album The Very Thought of You
 "Impossible", from the 1994 album The Screaming Jets by The Screaming Jets 
 "Impossible", from the 1997 album Wu-Tang Forever by the Wu-Tang Clan
 "Impossible", a song written by Alicia Keys and recorded by Christina Aguilera for her 2002 album Stripped
 "Impossible", from the 2003 album Animositisomina by Ministry
 "Impossible", from the 2003 album Being Somebody by Liberty X
 "Impossible", from the 2006 album Glory by Manafest
 "Impossible", from the 2007 album Our Ill Wills by the Shout Out Louds
 "Impossible", from the 2008 album Billion Dollar Sound by Rich Cronin
 "Impossible", from the 2009 album All I Ever Wanted by Kelly Clarkson
 "Imposible" (Luis Fonsi and Ozuna song), 2018
 "Imposible" (KZ Tandingan and Shanti Dope song), 2019

Film and television
 The Impossible (1965 film), an Egyptian film
 Imposible (2004 film), an Argentine film
 The Impossible (2012 film), an English-language Spanish disaster drama film directed by J. A. Bayona
 Impossible (2015 film), a Chinese film
 Impossible (game show), a British television game show
 The Impossibles (TV series), a 1960s Hanna-Barbera cartoon television series
 "Impossible" (Desperate Housewives), an episode of the TV series Desperate Housewives

Fictional characters
 The Impossible Man, a Marvel Comics character
 Doctor Impossible, a DC Comics supervillain
 Mr. Impossible, part of the Mr. Men series of books by Roger Hargreaves

Other uses
 Impossible TV or Impossible, a Denver-based production company (now defunct)
Impossible Foods, company that makes plant-based alternatives to meat
 Impossible Project, the previous name of Polaroid B.V., an instant film camera and film company
 Impossible.com, innovation group and incubator
 Ollie Impossible (or simply "impossible"), a skateboarding trick
 Impossible (novel), by Danielle Steel
 Imposible (wrestler), a Mexican luchador enmascarado (masked professional wrestler)
 The Impossible (book), by Joyce Smith

See also
 "It's Impossible", a song made famous by Perry Como
 Impossibility, a term used in contract law
 Impossible object, a type of optical illusion
 Possibility (disambiguation)